Terzyisko is a village located in Troyan Municipality, Lovech Province, northern Bulgaria.

References

Villages in Lovech Province